The Genesis Prize is a $1 million annual prize awarded to Jewish people who have achieved significant professional success, in recognition of their accomplishments, contributions to humanity, and commitment to Jewish values.

The prize was founded in 2012 with a $100 million endowment from five Russian philanthropists: Mikhail Fridman, Pyotr Aven, German Khan, Stan Polovets, and Alexander Knaster. The prize was established under the administration of the Genesis Prize Foundation, in partnership with the Israeli Prime Minister's Office and the Jewish Agency for Israel. It has been referred to as the "Jewish Nobel Prize", causing some commentators to question the need for a "Jewish" Nobel Prize.

In 2018, prize winner Natalie Portman declined to attend the prize ceremony because Israel's prime minister, Benjamin Netanyahu, was set to give a speech at the ceremony. In 2019 Robert Kraft's award was also questioned because of his legal troubles.

In 2021, Rabbi Lord Jonathan Sacks was awarded a posthumous Genesis Lifetime Achievement Award, presented to his wife by President of Israel, Isaac Herzog.

Thus far, all laureates have opted to give the $1 million prize money to philanthropic causes of their choice.

Laureate selection
Members of the committee that selects Genesis Prize laureates are chosen based on their leadership and support for Jewish causes. Current and former committee members include Elie Wiesel, Meir Shamgar, Lawrence Summers, Yuli Edelstein, Jonathan Sacks, Isaac Herzog, and Nathan Sharansky.

In 2020, the Foundation opened the selection process to online voting and invited the public to nominate and vote for the 2021 Genesis Prize Laureate. Close to two hundred thousand Jews on six continents participated in the voting. The final selection of the Laureate remains with the two committees.

Laureates

Genesis Prize laureates

Controversies 
The Prize came under scrutiny from the start for its "right-leaning, overwhelmingly male selection committee."

According to Haaretz, Ruth Bader Ginsburg was initially the sole 2018 award recipient. But according to a committee source, when the Prime Minister's Office learned that a critic of Trump would be publicly given an award by Netanyahu, it was transferred to Portman. As consolation, Ginsburg was given a separate "Lifetime Achievement Award." Another committee source denied this was the reason the award was changed. 

On November 7, 2017, the Genesis Prize Foundation announced that actress Natalie Portman was the 2018 Genesis Prize Laureate, and that she would donate the $1 million Genesis Prize Award to philanthropic programs focused on women's equality, education, economic advancement, health, and political participation. A month later, Israeli philanthropist Morris Kahn pledged another $1 million in Portman's honor, bringing the total gift to $2 million. The prize ceremony was canceled in April 2018 after Portman's representatives told the press that "recent events in Israel have been extremely distressing to her and she does not feel comfortable participating in any public events in Israel." Portman later claimed that she was not boycotting Israel, but that she didn't want to "appear as endorsing" prime minister Benjamin Netanyahu, who was set to give a speech at the ceremony.

In January 2020, partly as a result of the Portman controversy,  the Genesis Prize Foundation and the Israeli Prime Minister's Office agreed to terminate their agreement which required the Prime Minister to present the award to the Genesis Prize Laureate at a ceremony in Jerusalem.

In 2019, Prize Laureate Robert Kraft was named as one of more than 200 people involved in a Florida solicitation sting operation. Genesis Prize Foundation Chairman Stan Polovets said that the Prize to Kraft would not be rescinded, noting that in democratic countries “everyone is entitled to the presumption of innocence.” All charges against Kraft were later dropped.

Notes

References

External links 
 Genesis Prize

International awards
Awards established in 2012
Israeli awards
2012 establishments in Israel
Religion-related awards